Denys John Jones (19 October 1930 — May 2003) was a Welsh footballer who played as a winger.

Career
In April 1951, Jones signed for Norwich City from Great Yarmouth Town. Jones made five Football League appearances for Norwich over the course of two years, before moving to Chelmsford City. Jones would subsequently go on to play for Wisbech Town, Lowestoft Town and Gothic.

References

1930 births
2003 deaths
Association football wingers
Welsh footballers
Footballers from Aberdare
Great Yarmouth Town F.C. players
Norwich City F.C. players
Chelmsford City F.C. players
Wisbech Town F.C. players
Lowestoft Town F.C. players
English Football League players
Gothic F.C. players